DaVonté Damion Lacy (born March 11, 1993) is an American professional basketball player for Ionikos Nikaias of the Greek Basket League.

College career
Lacy attended Washington State for four years. As a junior, Lacy averaged 19.4 points per game, which included a career-high 39-point game against California. As a senior, he averaged 16.9 points, 2.6 rebounds, 2.1 assists and a steal per game. He was named to the First Team All-Pac-12 Conference.

Professional career
Lacy began his professional career in Austria with Güssing Knights. During the 2019-20 season, Lacy played four games for Merkezefendi and 11 games for USC Heidelberg. He averaged 18.7 points, 3.8 rebounds, 2.9 assists and 1.1 steals per game for Heidelberg.

On May 2, 2020, Lacy signed with Donar in the Netherlands for the 2020–21 season.

On July 22, 2021, Lacy signed with Patrioti Levice in the Slovak Basketball League. He averaged 17.1 points, 3.6 rebounds, 4.2 assists and 1.5 steals per game. On January 15, 2022, Lacy signed with Medipolis SC Jena of the German ProA.

Lacy inked a deal with Bashkimi Prizren from Kosovo in August 2022. On September 20, 2022, he moved to Greek club Ionikos Nikaias.

References

External links
RealGM Profile
Washington State Cougars bio

1993 births
Living people
American men's basketball players
American expatriate basketball people in Austria
American expatriate basketball people in Germany
American expatriate basketball people in Greece
American expatriate basketball people in Kosovo
American expatriate basketball people in the Netherlands
American expatriate basketball people in Slovakia
American expatriate basketball people in Turkey
Basketball people from Washington (state)
BC Zepter Vienna players
Donar (basketball club) players
Dutch Basketball League players
Ehingen Urspring players
Ionikos Nikaias B.C. players
Merkezefendi Belediyesi Denizli Basket players
PS Karlsruhe Lions players
Science City Jena players
UBC Güssing Knights players
USC Heidelberg players
Washington State Cougars men's basketball players